Tilapertin (INN) is a drug which is described as an antipsychotic.

See also
 Bitopertin

References

Acetates
Antipsychotics
Trifluoromethyl compounds
Piperazines